Lydell Carr (born May 27, 1965) is a former American football running back in the National Football League who played for the Phoenix Cardinals. He played college football for the Oklahoma Sooners. He also played in the World League of American Football for the Barcelona Dragons and Ohio Glory.

References

1965 births
Living people
American football running backs
Phoenix Cardinals players
Barcelona Dragons players
Ohio Glory players
Oklahoma Sooners football players